Workers' Settlement is a 1965 Soviet drama film directed by Vladimir Vengerov.

Plot 
Pleshcheev lost his sight during the war. Returning home, he begins to drink. His wife decides to leave the family, and he remains with his son. And suddenly, an old friend of Pleshcheyev returns from the army...

Cast 
 Oleg Borisov as Leonid
 Lyudmila Gurchenko as Mariya - Leonid's wife
 Nikolai Simonov as Sotnikov
 Tatyana Doronina as Polina
 Viktor Avdyushko as Grisha
 Elena Dobronravova as Frosya
 Lyubov Sokolova as Kapustina
 Viktor Chekmaryov
 Aleksandr Sokolov as Dmitriy Prokhorov
 Mariya Prizvan-Sokolova

References

External links 
 

1965 films
1960s Russian-language films
Soviet drama films
1965 drama films